"Autobahn" is a 1975 song by German electronic band Kraftwerk, being the second and lead single from their studio album of the same name. The song was composed by Ralf Hütter and Florian Schneider of the band, with Emil Schult collaborating on the lyrics. It is co-produced by Conny Plank, and was the band's first track to use sung lyrics. Recorded in 1974, the song is designed to capture the feel of driving on a motorway. "Autobahn" is Kraftwerk's biggest hit in the US, reaching number 25 on the Billboard Hot 100.

Composition and lyrics
Unlike Kraftwerk's later work, "Autobahn" was only released with German lyrics, without a simultaneous English-language release. The main refrain "Fahren Fahren Fahren" was often mistaken for the English phrase "Fun Fun Fun" and thought to be a reference to the 1964 Beach Boys' song "Fun, Fun, Fun" to which band member Wolfgang Flür later commented:

Ralf Hütter has said that The Beach Boys were an influence on the band, but described the song as a "sound painting", reflecting the band's experiences on tour. The song also included acoustic elements such as a flute played by Florian Schneider and atmospheric guitars. For this song a Minimoog was used to play the bass line, and an octave riff with added analogue echo. It also was used of a vocoder to process some of the vocals and use of the 'motorik' beat.

Release and reception
The original version of the homonymous album of 1974 lasts 22 minutes, but the song was reduced to 3 minutes in its single version. The song was Kraftwerk's first hit, it reached No. 11 on the British charts where it was later included in the UK compilation LP Exceller 8. The single was also successful in other countries, it reached No. 25 in US Billboard Hot 100 and No. 43 in Adult Contemporary. It also reached No. 9 in Germany and No. 12 in Canada. A 12 minute animation video of "Autobahn" by Roger Mainwood was released in 1979. "Autobahn" is widely considered to be one of Kraftwerk's best songs. In 2020, Billboard and The Guardian ranked the song number six and number five, respectively, on their lists of the greatest Kraftwerk songs.

Charts

Year-end Charts

References

Songs about cars
Songs about roads
1974 songs
1975 singles
Kraftwerk songs
Songs written by Florian Schneider
Songs written by Ralf Hütter
Songs written by Emil Schult
Vertigo Records singles
Philips Records singles